Thaai Nadu is a 1947 Indian Tamil-language film directed by T. S. Mani. The film stars Battling Mani in the lead role.

Cast 
The list is adapted from Film News Anandan's database.
Battling Mani
S. T. Williams
V. P. S. Mani
T. K. Krishnaiah
M. R. Sundari
N. C. Meera

Production 
The film was produced by S. M. Nayagam, who produced the first ever Sinhala talkie Kadawunu Poronduwa, under his own banner Chitrakala Movietone and was directed by T. S. Mani. T. S. Mani also wrote the story and screenplay. Dialogues were penned by T. V. Natarajasamy. G. G. Sithi handled cinematography while the editing was done by Abraham. Art direction was by Kotvankar and still photography was done by V. V. Iyer.

Soundtrack 
Music was composed by R. Narayana Iyer while the lyrics were penned by T. V. Natarajasamy.

List of songs
Engal Indhiya Bharathiye - V. N. Sundaram, A. P. Komala

Reception 
Writing in 2017, media person D. B. S. Jeyaraj said, "The film was a smashing box office hit."

References

External links 
 - A song from the film sung by V. N. Sundharam & A. P. Komala

Indian black-and-white films